Blenheim (1927–1958), also known as Blenheim II, was a British Thoroughbred race horse who won The Derby in 1930. As sire, he had a major influence on pedigrees around the world. Blenheim was highly tried, by European standards, as a two-year-old in 1929, winning four of his seven races. In the following season he was beaten in his first two races before recording an upset 18/1 win in the Derby. His racing career was ended by injury soon afterwards, and he was retired to stud, where he became an extremely successful and influential breeding stallion, both in Europe and North America.

Background
Blenheim was a brown horse standing 15.3 hands high with a white star and a white sock on his left hind leg, bred by Henry Herbert, 6th Earl of Carnarvon at his Highclere stud. He was sired by the good sire Blandford, a three-time British champion sire, whose other progeny included Bahram, Brantome, Trigo, Pasch and Windsor Lad. Blenheim's dam, Malva (1919–1941) who stood barely 15 hands, won three minor races for Lord Carnarvon before becoming a highly successful broodmare. She was the dam of seven winners, including the Coronation Cup winners King Salmon (sire of Herringbone) and His Grace.

As a yearling, Blenheim was sold for 4,100 guineas to the Aga Khan. He was sent into training with Richard Dawson at his Whatcombe stables near Wantage in Oxfordshire.

Race record

1929: two-year-old season
Blenheim began his racing career in April 1929 when he won a £200 plate at Newbury Racecourse. He then finished second in the Stud Produce Stakes at Sandown and won the Speedy Plate at Windsor. He was then moved up in class to contest the New Stakes over five furlongs at Royal Ascot. Ridden by Dawson's stable jockey Michael Beary he started at odds of 7/2 and won from Lord Woolavington's Press Gang.

In autumn he finished second to Fair Diana in the Champagne Stakes and then won the Hopeful Stakes at Newmarket Racecourse. On his final race of the season he started favourite for the Middle Park Stakes but finished second by half a length to Press Gang. It was noted that Blenheim may have been feeling the effects of his "punishing" schedule. He ended the season with earnings of £4,497.

1930: three-year-old season
Blenheim was slow to find his form as a three-year-old and began his 1930 campaign by running unplaced behind Christopher Robin in the Greenham Stakes at Newbury. Despite his poor performance in the trial, he was well-fancied for the 2000 Guineas at Newmarket two weeks later. He finished fourth of the twenty-eight runners behind Diolite, Paradine and Silver Flare.

A month later, Blenheim was moved up in distance to contest the Derby over one and a half miles at Epsom Downs Racecourse. Beary elected to ride the Aga Khan's more fancied runner Rustom Pasha, while the ride on Blenheim went to Harry Wragg, a jockey whose expertise at holding up horses for a late run had earned him the nickname "The Head Waiter". The race attracted its customary huge crowd, with the spectators including the King and Queen as well as the Prince of Wales and the Duke of York. Blenheim started an 18/1 outsider in a field of seventeen. Rustom Pasha led the field on the final turn but weakened and dropped away in the straight. Blenheim was produced by Wragg with a perfectly timed run to take the lead inside the final furlong and won by a length from Iliad with Diolite in third. After the race Wragg described the winner as "a lovely little horse" and explained that although he had only made very gradual progress in the second half of the race he had always been confident of victory.

After the Derby, Blenheim was being prepared or a run in the Eclipse Stakes when he sustained a tendon injury. He did not recover sufficiently to resume racing and was retired to stud.

Assessment
In their book A Century of Champions, John Randall and Tony Morris rated Blenheim an “inferior” Derby winner.

Stud record
He entered stud in 1932 at the Aga Khan's Haras Marly-la-Ville in Val-d'Oise, France, where he stood at a fee of 400 guineas. In his first crop of foals, he sired Mumtaz Begum (bred eight winners, including Nasrullah), followed the next year by Mahmoud, who won the 1936 Epsom Derby. His next crop of foals included Donatello, one of  Federico Tesio’s best horses who sired Crepello and Alycidon.

He was sold after that year's breeding season for £45,000  to an American syndicate that included Claiborne Farm, Calumet Farm, Greentree Farm and Stoner Creek Stud before being exported to America in 1936 where he was known as Blenheim II. In America he sired the 1941 U.S. Triple Crown champion, Whirlaway and Jet Pilot, who won the 1947 Kentucky Derby and $198,740. Blenheim was also the damsire of Hill Gail, Mark-Ye-Well, Kauai King, Ponder and Le Paillon. Blenheim was American Champion sire in 1941.

Blenheim died in 1958 and was buried at Claiborne Farm.

Pedigree

 Blenheim was inbred 4×4  to Isinglass, meaning that this stallion appears twice in the fourth generation of his pedigree.

References

External links
 Blenheim II's pedigree and stats

1927 racehorse births
1958 racehorse deaths
Racehorses trained in the United Kingdom
Racehorses bred in the United Kingdom
United States Champion Thoroughbred Sires
Thoroughbred family 1-e
Chefs-de-Race
Epsom Derby winners